Portraits  is the second studio album by American singer-songwriter Greyson Chance. It is Chance's first full release since Hold On 'til the Night in 2011.  The album was released through AWAL Recordings America on March 15, 2019. The album was supported by three singles: "Shut Up", "Timekeeper", and "Yours". Willy Beaman is the primary producer on the album, with Christian Medice and Todd Spadafore individually contributing production on two tracks.

Track listing

References

2019 albums
Greyson Chance albums